Milena Nikolić (born 6 July 1992) is a Bosnian professional footballer who plays as a forward for Frauen-Bundesliga club Bayer Leverkusen and the Bosnia and Herzegovina women's national football team.

Club career
While playing for of ŽFK Spartak, she was the 2013–14 UEFA Women's Champions League overall top scorer, scoring 11 goals, one ahead of Martina Müller.

International goals

References

External links 
 

1992 births
Living people
Bosnia and Herzegovina expatriate women's footballers
Bosnia and Herzegovina expatriate sportspeople in Serbia
Bosnia and Herzegovina expatriate sportspeople in Germany
ŽFK Spartak Subotica players
Expatriate women's footballers in Serbia
Expatriate women's footballers in Germany
SC Sand players
Bayer 04 Leverkusen (women) players
Women's association football forwards
Bosnia and Herzegovina women's international footballers
Serbs of Bosnia and Herzegovina
Bosnia and Herzegovina women's footballers